Francesco Cocchi (Budrio, February 13, 1788 - Bologna, 1865) was an Italian painter and scenic designer.

Biography
He trained under Antonio Basoli, a Neoclassical painter and incisor. For many years, he worked in Hamburg, Germany as a scenic designer. He became professor of perspective at the Accademia Clementina, and published in 1855 a text on the subject.

References

1788 births
1865 deaths
19th-century Italian painters
Italian male painters
Italian scenic designers
German scenic designers
Painters from Bologna
19th-century Italian male artists